Carole Lin is a Singaporean actress. She was prominently a full-time Mediacorp artiste from 1995 to 2009.

Career
Lin joined MediaCorp after taking part in Star Search Singapore 1995. She shot to fame for her role in The Price of Peace and won the Best Actress award at the Star Awards 1997. Hers and Hong Huifang's rape scenes were named the Top 5 Most Memorable Scenes at the Star Awards 2007 anniversary special. She left MediaCorp in 2009 after her second marriage and moved abroad.

Filmography
The Journey: A Voyage (2013) as Huang Zhenniang 黄珍娘
I'm in Charge (2013) as Lin Xiufen
My Buddy (2009) as Chen Meijin (US Dollar)
Rhythm Of Life (2008)
The Golden Path (2007)
Metamorphosis 破茧而出 (2007) as Melinda Guan Xiu Qing 关秀清
Making Miracles 奇迹 (2007) as Yang Zhihua 
Police And Thief - Desperate Housewives (2007) 
Phua Chu Kang - The Return Of The Kin (2007)
A New Life 有福 (2005) as Zhang Zhenzhu
Zero to Hero 阴差阳错 (2005) as Ah Car's mother
My Love, My Home (2004)
Man at Forty 跑吧!男人 (2004) as Fried Chicken
Springs Of Life (2003)
Fantasy 星梦情真 (2002)
Health Matters 一切由慎开始 之《糖衣苦果》 (2002) as Lilian
Wok Of Life II 春到人间 (2002)
A War Diary 战争日记 (English drama) (2001)
The Hotel 大酒店 (2001)
The Reunion 顶天立地 (2001)
Bukit Ho Swee 河水山 (2001)
My Home Affairs 家事 (2000)
Hainan Kopi Tales 琼园咖啡香 (2000)
Lost Soul 另类佳人 (1999) as Li Bijiao 李碧娇
From the Medical Files 2 医生档案2 (1999) as Lin Biqi 林碧琪
Act 235  刑事235 (1998) as Nie Keer 聂可儿
From The Medical Files 医生档案 (1998)
A Piece Of Sky 锁不住的天空 (1998)  
The Price of Peace 和平的代价 (1997) as Wang Qiumei
Roses, Complete With Thorns 单身女郎 (1997) 
Tofu Street 豆腐街 (1996)
The Unbroken Cycle 解连环 (1996)
Marriage, Collars and Sense 5C 老公 (1996)
Diary Of A Teacher 老师的日记 (1996)
Brave New World  新阿郎 (1996)
Wild Orchids  再见莹光兰 (1996) 
Tales Of The Third Kind 第三类剧场 (1995)

Personal life
Carole was married in 1999 before it ended in divorce in 2002. In June 2008, she married aeronautical engineer, Bertrand Gouge, at a chateau in France. They divorced in November 2009. Carole married for the third time to entrepreneur David Lim. She currently works as a creative consultant for a chiropractic clinic.  She gave birth to her first child, Brooklyn, on 19 August 2015 at the age of 42.

Accolades

References

Living people
Singaporean film actresses
1973 births
Singaporean people of Chinese descent
20th-century Singaporean actresses
21st-century Singaporean actresses